Mark Wilson (25 November 1890 — 3 August 1982) was an English-born Scottish first-class cricketer.

Wilson was born in November 1890 at Whitburn, County Durham. He was a club cricketer for Clackmannan County/ His club career was somewhat eventful, with him making an allegation to the police that he had been assaulted by a spectator during a match in 1924. He made a single appearance in first-class cricket for Scotland against Lancashire at Old Trafford on Scotland's 1925 tour of England. Batting twice in the match, he was dismissed without scoring by Dick Tyldesley, while in their second innings he was dismissed for 4 runs by Len Hopwood. With his left-arm fast-medium bowling, he bowled eight wicketless overs. Outside of cricket, Wilson played football for Sauchie Juniors F.C., signing for the club in August 1922. Away from sports, he was by profession a foreman at a woollen mill. Wilson died in August 1982 at Sauchie, Clackmannanshire.

References

External links
 

1890 births
1982 deaths
People from Whitburn, Tyne and Wear
Cricketers from Tyne and Wear
People educated at Perth Academy
Scottish cricketers
Scottish footballers
Sauchie F.C. players